Triple J's One Night Stand is a concert hosted in a remote town or city in Australia annually.  It is promoted and organised by national radio station Triple J. In previous years, the host town was selected in the form of a competition where residents of the town must gain approval from local government and a venue. For the 2009 event, Triple J itself simply decided to host the event in Sale. Triple J arranges the artists to perform – usually four high-profile Australian bands of a variety of genres.

The concert is a drug and alcohol free event, and entry is free.

The concept of the One Night Stand was the brainchild of then triple j Marketing Manager Louis Rogers, with the intention of raising the awareness and relevance of triple j in regional communities. It was made possible by gaining special funding from the Australian Broadcasting Corporation.

Annual hosts

2004 – Natimuk, Victoria
The first event was held in Natimuk in Victoria on 28 July 2004.  Performers included local band Less Than Perfection, followed by Eskimo Joe, Koolism, The Dissociatives and Grinspoon.  Attendance was about 9,000.  Entries that year required a letter from the mayor, permission from a venue, a petition, and a souvenir.  The Natimuk organising committee submitted a petition of 3,000 names – the population of the town at the time was 500.  They also raised $30,000 in pledges from local businesses to support the event.

2005 – Ayr, Queensland
The second event was hosted by the town of Ayr in North Queensland on 18 May 2005.  The local support act was A14, followed by End of Fashion, Katalyst, Shihad, and the Hilltop Hoods.  Over 10,000 attended the concert.  As in previous years, support from the local council, a venue and a petition were required.  The petition had 4,000 signatures (for a town of 8,500).

2006 – Port Pirie, South Australia
The third event was hosted by Port Pirie in the Spencer Gulf area of South Australia on 12 April 2006.  The local support act was Sector 12, followed by The Herd, Xavier Rudd, Kid Kenobi and MC Shureshock, followed by The Living End.  The entry included a letter of support from Mike Rann, the Premier of South Australia, as well as a petition with 8,000 names (the town's population is 13,500).  A new addition to the competition entry procedure this year was to design a theme park based around a notable location or event in the town.  The Port Pirie entrants designed one built around the chimney stack from the local lead smelter.

2007 – Cowra, New South Wales
On 16 March 2007, it was announced that the fourth event would be held in Cowra, New South Wales, on 20 April 2007. Myf Warhurst, Jay and the Doctor hosted the event.  Bands who performed at the event were Silverchair, Midnight Juggernauts, Behind Crimson Eyes, DJ FunkTrust, an unsigned band from Lithgow, Flatline Drama and local band Leap of Faith.

2008 – Collie, Western Australia
On 20 March 2008 it was announced that the fifth event would be held in Collie, Western Australia, on 26 April 2008. The bands that played at the event were Cog, Pnau and Faker, as well as local band This End Up, the winners of Unearthed. A group of fans in the audience convinced Rosie Beaton to "do a little dance" as she went off stage.

2009 – Sale, Victoria
On 2 April 2009 it was announced that the sixth event would be held in Sale, Victoria, on 30 May 2009. The bands that played at the event were Eskimo Joe, The Butterfly Effect, Children Collide, Miami Horror and Hilltop Hoods, as well as Unearthed winners And Burn. Triple J presenters Robbie, Marieke and the Doctor, Tom and Alex and Scott Dooley hosted the event live on national radio. 12,000 people attended the event at the Sale Football Ground in cold and wet conditions.

2010 – Alice Springs, Northern Territory
It was announced on 9 February 2010 that Alice Springs in the Northern Territory would host the 2010 One Night Stand, with The John Butler Trio headlining the free event to be held at Traeger Park, in central Alice Springs. It was then later announced on 17 February 2010 that Gyroscope, Bluejuice and Megan Washington would support them, with Triple J Unearthed winners Tjupi Band. Triple J and Frenzal Rhomb's resident Doctor, Lindsay McDougall hosted the event as well as Nina Las Vagas, the host of Triple J's House Party.

2011 – Tumby Bay, South Australia
Tumby Bay, north of Port Lincoln on South Australia's Eyre Peninsula, hosted the event in April 2011, featuring the bands Birds of Tokyo, Art vs. Science and The Jezabels and locally "Unearthed" musician Joshy Willo . The town's population swelled from 1,000 to over 12,000 for the event.

2012 – Dalby, Queensland
210 km west of Brisbane, Dalby (popñ 10000) hosted the event in June 2012, featuring the bands and artists The Temper Trap, 360, Stonefield, Matt Corby and local "Unearthed" act Mace and the Motor.

2013 – Dubbo, New South Wales
Dubbo hosted the event in April 2013, featuring the bands and artists Flume, Seth Sentry, The Rubens and Ball Park Music, as well as local "Unearthed" band People's Palace.

2014 – Mildura, Victoria
Mildura hosted the event in May 2014, featuring the bands and artists The Jungle Giants, Violent Soho, Illy, Dan Sultan and RÜFÜS, as well as local experimental hip-hop duo, WZRDKID.

2015 – Not Held
No "One Night Stand" held. Instead "Beat The Drum" was held.

2016 – Geraldton, Western Australia
Triple J's One Night Stand was hosted on 9 April in the Western Australian city of Geraldton. The event featured acts from Alison Wonderland, Urthboy and Boy & Bear. Special Guests included Benjamin Joseph from SAFIA, Bertie Blackman, Alex the Kid (Triple J's Unearthed 2016 winner), Patience Hodgson from The Grates and Bernard Fanning from Powderfinger. The estimated attendance was around 15000 (of a town with 35000 people).

2017 – Mount Isa, Queensland
The 2017 One Night Stand was held in Mount Isa, in north west Queensland and featured San Cisco, Tash Sultana, The Smith Street Band and Thundamentals, as well as local Unearthed artist Lucky Luke. Thelma Plum made a special guest appearance during San Cisco's set.

2018 - St Helens, Tasmania
The 2018 One Night Stand was held in St Helens, a town of 2,070 people on the east coast of Tasmania.  Featuring Vance Joy, Peking Duk, Tkay Maidza, Middle Kids, Alex the Astronaut and the 2018 Unearthed winner The Sleepyheads. The 2018 One Night Stand saw over 20,000 people attend marking it as the biggest One Night Stand so far. Special guests included Luca Brasi (Tyler Richardson and Tom Busby), Cloud Control (Alister Wright), [Arno Faraji, SAFIA (Ben Woolner), Carmouflage Rose, Jesswar, Julia Jacklin, Kwame, Ruby Fields, and Ball Park Music (Sam Cromack).

2019 - Lucindale, South Australia

The 2019 One Night Stand was held in Lucindale, a town on the Limestone Coast of South Australia with 301 residents. Acts included G Flip, Ocean Alley, Meg Mac, the Hilltop Hoods, and Triple J Unearthed competition winners from Mt Gambier, Chelsea Manor. An estimated 20,000 to 25,000 people attended.

2020 and 2021 – Not Held
No "One Night Stand" was held in 2020 or 2021 due to the COVID-19 pandemic in Australia.

Awards and nominations

ARIA Music Awards
The ARIA Music Awards is an annual awards ceremony that recognises excellence, innovation, and achievement across all genres of Australian music. They commenced in 1987. 

! 
|-
| ARIA Music Awards of 2013
| triple j's One Night Stand
|rowspan="2" | Best Original Soundtrack, Cast or Show Album
| 
|rowspan="2" | 
|-
| ARIA Music Awards of 2014
| triple j's One Night Stand: Mildura
| 
|-

References

External links
Triple J events

Music festivals in Australia
Triple J